WVMJ (104.5 FM) is a commercial radio station broadcasting a CHR format, known as "Magic 104." Licensed to Conway, New Hampshire, the station serves the Mount Washington Valley of Northeast New Hampshire and the Sebago Lake Region of Maine.  On weekends, it carries "American Top 40" hosted by Ryan Seacrest, and syndicated by Premiere Networks.

The station is currently owned by Mt. Washington Radio & Gramophone, L.L.C.  Programming is simulcast on FM translator station W251BD at 98.1 MHz in Berlin, New Hampshire.

History
Before the station was built, its construction permit was assigned the call sign WMLY on June 28, 1989.  It took several years to sign-on but finally began broadcasting on October 23, 1995.   It took the call letters WBNC-FM. As WBNC-FM, it aired a country music format simulcast with co-owned AM 1050 WBNC.

On December 17, 2001 it became the current WVMJ.  WVMJ changed formats to Contemporary Hit Radio and its moniker to Magic 104 on December 26, 2001.

Translator

References

External links

VMJ
Radio stations established in 1995
Carroll County, New Hampshire
1995 establishments in New Hampshire
Contemporary hit radio stations in the United States